The 2008 Utah State Aggies football team represented Utah State University as a member of the Western Athletic Conference (WAC) in 2008 NCAA Division I FBS football season. The Aggies were led by fourth-year head coach Brent Guy and played their home games in Romney Stadium in Logan, Utah.

Guy was fired prior to the end of the season after the team compiled a 2–9 record. At Utah State, Guy never finished a season with more than three wins. He coached the Aggies in their final game, in which they defeated New Mexico State, 47–2, and completed their schedule with a 3–9 record.

Schedule

References

Utah State
Utah State Aggies football seasons
Utah State  Aggies football